Foolin' Myself is an album of trio performances by the American jazz pianist Jaki Byard recorded in 1988 and released on the Italian Soul Note label.

Reception
The Allmusic review by Ken Dryden awarded the album  stars, stating "While the pianist's technique is impressive as always, his songs are not as strong as on many of his other releases".

Track listing
All compositions by Jaki Byard except as indicated
 "Suite 27: Waterfalls, Highways, Skyways, Waterways" - 5:11 
 "Oslo to Kristiansund to Malmo" - 3:10 
 "Searchlight No. 2" - 9:22 
 "Stage I / Stage II" - 4:17 
 "Breath" (Ralph Hamperian) - 8:27 
 "Foolin' Myself" (Jack Lawrence, Peter Tinturin) - 3:50 
 "Land of Love" - 6:36 
Recorded at Sound Ideas Studios in New York City on August 25, 1988

Personnel
Jaki Byard – piano
Ralph Hamperian - bass
Richard Allen - drums

References

Black Saint/Soul Note albums
Jaki Byard albums
1988 albums